Transtillaspis multicornuta is a species of moth of the family Tortricidae. It is found in Ecuador in Carchi and Napo provinces.

The wingspan is about 19 mm. The ground colour of the forewings is greyish with brownish admixture and brownish suffusions. The hindwings are cream with grey suffusions and darker diffuse strigulation (fine streaks).

Etymology
The species name refers to high number of cornuti and is derived from Latin multum (meaning a great number).

References

Moths described in 2008
Transtillaspis
Moths of South America
Taxa named by Józef Razowski